The 1988 Tulsa Golden Hurricane football team represented the University of Tulsa as an independent during the 1988 NCAA Division I-A football season. In their first year under head coach David Rader, the Golden Hurricane compiled a 4–7 record. The team's statistical leaders included quarterback T. J. Rubley with 2,497 passing yards, Brett Adams with 602 rushing yards, and Dan Bitson with 1,138 receiving yards.

Schedule

.

Roster

References

Tulsa
Tulsa Golden Hurricane football seasons
Tulsa Golden Hurricane football